Malawian English is the English language as spoken in Malawi. English is the country's official language.

Introduction
English was introduced into Malawi towards the end of the 19th century, due to the influence of British explorers, missionaries, the arrival of the African Lakes Corporation, and colonial administrators present since the establishment in the 1890s of the British Central Africa Protectorate. The seventy years of British colonial rule that followed the Scramble for Africa, set the groundwork for English to grow into the area's dominant and most socially prestigious language.

Dominance
Since Malawian independence, the dominance of English has continued:
 official government records are written in English,
 parliament conducts its deliberations in English,
 the laws of Malawi are written in English,
 progression into secondary and higher education requires certification of competence in English,
 nearly all Malawian newspapers are published in English (though some include small Chichewa supplements),
 English remains the language of commerce in the country.

This remains true despite a large majority of Malawians speaking Chichewa and the small number of English speakers outside urban centres. Also, in Malawian government schools, students are taught in Chichewa, and learn English as a second language from about age 10. But in international schools in Malawi (like Saint Andrew's International High School in Blantyre) which follow the British curriculum, English is the language students are taught in, and do not learn Chichewa at all, as it is regarded as a local language.

Replacement of local vocabulary
English words are replacing their equivalents in other Malawi languages. One study of a corpus of Chichewa discourse captured over a ten-year period found that references to numbers greater than 3 were exclusively in English, at least in urban areas.

Non-linguistic expressions
Malawian English features some non-linguistic expressions that are still used, such as "eesh!", an exclamation meaning "oh my!"

Notes

External links 
 Malawi's Ministry of Information and Tourism
 Malawi SDNP and UNDP Malawi, supported by the United Nations Development Programme
 University of Malawi website, including admission requirements
 Mzuzu University

Languages attested from the 19th century
Languages of Malawi
Dialects of English